John Price Carr House is a historic home located near Charlotte, Mecklenburg County, North Carolina.  It was built in 1904, and is a two-story, Queen Anne style frame dwelling.  It has a high hipped roof, four-stage projecting tower, and wraparound porch.

It was listed on the National Register of Historic Places in 1980.

References

Houses on the National Register of Historic Places in North Carolina
Queen Anne architecture in North Carolina
Houses completed in 1904
Houses in Charlotte, North Carolina
National Register of Historic Places in Mecklenburg County, North Carolina